Tom Polger is a professor in the Department of Philosophy at the University of Cincinnati in the United States. His research focuses on naturalistic accounts of the metaphysics of mind. Polger is a past president of the Southern Society for Philosophy and Psychology.

Publications 
Books
 Polger, T. 2004. Natural Minds. Cambridge, MA: The MIT Press
 

Articles and chapters
 Polger, T. 2009. "Two Confusions Concerning Multiple Realizability". Philosophy of Science 75 (5): 537–547.
 Polger, T. 2009. "Evaluating the Evidence for Multiple Realization". Synthese 167 (3): 457–472.
 Polger, T. 2009. "Identity Theories". Philosophy Compass,4 (4): 1-13. (survey article)
 Polger, T. 2009. "As a Good Bartender Might: Whiskey and Natural Kinds". Whisk(e)y & Philosophy, F. Allhoff and M. Adams (eds.), Blackwell: 179–194.
 Polger, T. and L. Shapiro. 2008. "Understanding the Dimensions of Realization". Journal of Philosophy, CV (4): 213–222.
 Polger, T. 2008. H2O, ‘Water’, and Transparent Reduction. Erkenntnis, 69 (1): 109–130.
 Polger, T. 2008. "Computational Functionalism". In The Routledge Companion to the Philosophy of Psychology, P. Calvo and J. Symons (eds.), London: Routledge.
 Polger, T. 2007. "Realization and the Metaphysics of Mind". Australasian Journal of Philosophy, 85 (2): 233–259.
 Polger, T. 2007. "Rethinking the Evolution of Consciousness". In The Blackwell Companion to Consciousness, M. Velmans and S. Schneider (eds.), Blackwell Publishers.
 Polger, T. 2006. Some Metaphysical Anxieties of Reductionism. In The Matter of the Mind: Philosophical Essays on Psychology, Neuroscience and Reduction, M. Schouten and H. Looren de Jong (eds.), Blackwell Publishers.
 Polger, T. 2006. A Place for Dogs and Trees? An Essay on Gregg Rosenberg's, A Place for Consciousness. Psyche 12 (5): 1-20.
 Polger, T. and K. Sufka. 2006. Closing the Gap on Pain: Mechanism, Theory, and Fit. In New Essays on the Nature of Pain and the Methodology of its Study, M. Aydede (ed.). Cambridge, MA: The MIT Press.
 Polger, T. 2004. Neural Machinery and Realization. Philosophy of Science. 71 (5): 997–1006.
 Polger, T. 2002. Putnam's Intuition. Philosophical Studies, 109, 2: 143–170.
 Polger, T. and O. Flanagan. 2002. Consciousness, Adaptation and Epiphenomenalism. In Consciousness Evolving, J. Fetzer (Ed). Amsterdam: John Benjamins.
 Polger, T. and O. Flanagan. 2001. A Decade of Teleofunctionalism: Lycan's Consciousness and Consciousness and Experience. Minds and Machines, 11, 1: 113–126. (Review essay, with a reply from William Lycan, “Response to Polger and Flanagan,” pp. 127–132.)
 Polger, T. 2000. Zombies Explained. In Dennett's Philosophy: A Comprehensive Assessment, D. Ross, A. Brook, and D. Thompson (Eds). Cambridge, MA: The MIT Press. (With a reply from Daniel Dennett, “With a Little Help from My Friends.”)
 Purves, D., Lotto, B., and T. Polger. 2000. Color Vision and the Four- Color-Map Problem. Journal of Cognitive Neuroscience, 12, 2: 233–237.
 Polger, T. and O. Flanagan. 1999. Natural Answers to Natural Questions. In Where Biology Meets Psychology: Philosophical Essays, V. Hardcastle (Ed). Cambridge, MA: The MIT Press.
 Flanagan, O. and T. Polger. 1995. Zombies and the Function of Consciousness. Journal of Consciousness Studies, 2, 4: 313–321. (With replies by Dennett, Güzeldere, Lanier, Bringsjord, Moody

References

External links 
Tom Polger's website

Philosophers of mind
Living people
University of Cincinnati faculty
Year of birth missing (living people)